The Kaluga constituency (No.99) is a Russian legislative constituency in Kaluga Oblast. Until 2007 the constituency covered the entirety of Kaluga and was based in eastern Kaluga Oblast. However, in 2016 the constituency changed significantly as it switched near all of its territory with Obninsk constituency, so currently Kaluga constituency is based in western Kaluga Oblast.

Members elected

Election results

1993

|-
! colspan=2 style="background-color:#E9E9E9;text-align:left;vertical-align:top;" |Candidate
! style="background-color:#E9E9E9;text-align:left;vertical-align:top;" |Party
! style="background-color:#E9E9E9;text-align:right;" |Votes
! style="background-color:#E9E9E9;text-align:right;" |%
|-
|style="background-color:#0085BE"|
|align=left|Ella Pamfilova
|align=left|Choice of Russia
|
|29.83%
|-
|style="background-color:"|
|align=left|Rudolf Panferov
|align=left|Independent
| -
|7.50%
|-
| colspan="5" style="background-color:#E9E9E9;"|
|- style="font-weight:bold"
| colspan="3" style="text-align:left;" | Total
| 
| 100%
|-
| colspan="5" style="background-color:#E9E9E9;"|
|- style="font-weight:bold"
| colspan="4" |Source:
|
|}

1995

|-
! colspan=2 style="background-color:#E9E9E9;text-align:left;vertical-align:top;" |Candidate
! style="background-color:#E9E9E9;text-align:left;vertical-align:top;" |Party
! style="background-color:#E9E9E9;text-align:right;" |Votes
! style="background-color:#E9E9E9;text-align:right;" |%
|-
|style="background-color:#FE4801"|
|align=left|Ella Pamfilova (incumbent)
|align=left|Pamfilova–Gurov–Lysenko
|
|21.89%
|-
|style="background-color:"|
|align=left|Vyacheslav Boyko
|align=left|Communist Party
|
|21.35%
|-
|style="background-color:"|
|align=left|Viktor Minakov
|align=left|Our Home – Russia
|
|14.28%
|-
|style="background-color:#F21A29"|
|align=left|Valery Reshitko
|align=left|Trade Unions and Industrialists – Union of Labour
|
|8.93%
|-
|style="background-color:#2C299A"|
|align=left|Andrey Blinov
|align=left|Congress of Russian Communities
|
|5.87%
|-
|style="background-color:"|
|align=left|Vladimir Kostenko
|align=left|Independent
|
|4.68%
|-
|style="background-color:"|
|align=left|Mikhail Sidorov
|align=left|Liberal Democratic Party
|
|4.53%
|-
|style="background-color:#CE1100"|
|align=left|Nikolay Zhdanov-Lutsenko
|align=left|My Fatherland
|
|3.12%
|-
|style="background-color:#D50000"|
|align=left|Vyacheslav Popkov
|align=left|Communists and Working Russia - for the Soviet Union
|
|2.86%
|-
|style="background-color:"|
|align=left|Nikolay Strelnikov
|align=left|Independent
|
|1.55%
|-
|style="background-color:"|
|align=left|Natalya Abramova
|align=left|Zemsky Sobor
|
|1.50%
|-
|style="background-color:"|
|align=left|Natalya Khramtsova
|align=left|Independent
|
|0.55%
|-
|style="background-color:#F9E2E3"|
|align=left|Nikolay Vasilevich
|align=left|Tikhonov-Tupolev-Tikhonov
|
|0.18%
|-
|style="background-color:#000000"|
|colspan=2 |against all
|
|6.95%
|-
| colspan="5" style="background-color:#E9E9E9;"|
|- style="font-weight:bold"
| colspan="3" style="text-align:left;" | Total
| 
| 100%
|-
| colspan="5" style="background-color:#E9E9E9;"|
|- style="font-weight:bold"
| colspan="4" |Source:
|
|}

1999

|-
! colspan=2 style="background-color:#E9E9E9;text-align:left;vertical-align:top;" |Candidate
! style="background-color:#E9E9E9;text-align:left;vertical-align:top;" |Party
! style="background-color:#E9E9E9;text-align:right;" |Votes
! style="background-color:#E9E9E9;text-align:right;" |%
|-
|style="background-color:"|
|align=left|Vyacheslav Boyko
|align=left|Communist Party
|
|20.52%
|-
|style="background:#E98282"| 
|align=left|Lyudmila Berestova
|align=left|Women of Russia
|
|12.52%
|-
|style="background-color:"|
|align=left|Anatoly Minakov
|align=left|Our Home – Russia
|
|9.99%
|-
|style="background:#3B9EDF"| 
|align=left|Viktor Pakhno
|align=left|Fatherland – All Russia
|
|8.37%
|-
|style="background-color:"|
|align=left|Tatyana Fedyayeva
|align=left|Independent
|
|5.43%
|-
|style="background-color:#FF4400"|
|align=left|Oleg Kutepov
|align=left|Andrey Nikolayev and Svyatoslav Fyodorov Bloc
|
|5.36%
|-
|style="background-color:"|
|align=left|Yury Zelnikov
|align=left|Independent
|
|5.06%
|-
|style="background-color:"|
|align=left|Aleksey Karpeyev
|align=left|Independent
|
|3.67%
|-
|style="background-color:"|
|align=left|Aleksandr Gonchar
|align=left|Independent
|
|3.41%
|-
|style="background-color:"|
|align=left|Galina Bozhedomova
|align=left|Yabloko
|
|3.38%
|-
|style="background-color:"|
|align=left|Yevgeny Shevchenko
|align=left|Independent
|
|2.47%
|-
|style="background-color:"|
|align=left|Andrey Dlugunovich
|align=left|Liberal Democratic Party
|
|1.89%
|-
|style="background-color:"|
|align=left|Vladimir Novopoltsev
|align=left|Independent
|
|1.89%
|-
|style="background-color:"|
|align=left|Valentin Dubachev
|align=left|Independent
|
|1.37%
|-
|style="background-color:#FCCA19"|
|align=left|Dmitry Vovchuk
|align=left|Congress of Russian Communities-Yury Boldyrev Movement
|
|1.05%
|-
|style="background-color:"|
|align=left|Sergey Vovchuk
|align=left|Independent
|
|0.99%
|-
|style="background-color:#084284"|
|align=left|Andrey Petrov
|align=left|Spiritual Heritage
|
|0.58%
|-
|style="background-color:#000000"|
|colspan=2 |against all
|
|10.56%
|-
| colspan="5" style="background-color:#E9E9E9;"|
|- style="font-weight:bold"
| colspan="3" style="text-align:left;" | Total
| 
| 100%
|-
| colspan="5" style="background-color:#E9E9E9;"|
|- style="font-weight:bold"
| colspan="4" |Source:
|
|}

2003

|-
! colspan=2 style="background-color:#E9E9E9;text-align:left;vertical-align:top;" |Candidate
! style="background-color:#E9E9E9;text-align:left;vertical-align:top;" |Party
! style="background-color:#E9E9E9;text-align:right;" |Votes
! style="background-color:#E9E9E9;text-align:right;" |%
|-
|style="background-color:"|
|align=left|Olga Selivyorstova
|align=left|Independent
|
|21.97%
|-
|style="background-color:"|
|align=left|Sergey Koshevoy
|align=left|Independent
|
|16.18%
|-
|style="background-color:"|
|align=left|Yury Levenkov
|align=left|Independent
|
|8.54%
|-
|style="background-color:"|
|align=left|Vyacheslav Boyko (incumbent)
|align=left|Communist Party
|
|6.94%
|-
|style="background-color:"|
|align=left|Oleg Kutepov
|align=left|Rodina
|
|5.07%
|-
|style="background-color:"|
|align=left|Vyacheslav Gorbatin
|align=left|Independent
|
|4.86%
|-
|style="background-color:"|
|align=left|Andrey Zavrazhnov
|align=left|Independent
|
|4.61%
|-
|style="background-color:"|
|align=left|Sergey Fadeyev
|align=left|Yabloko
|
|3.27%
|-
|style="background-color:"|
|align=left|Yevgeny Shevchenko
|align=left|Independent
|
|3.24%
|-
|style="background-color:"|
|align=left|Sergey Panasov
|align=left|Liberal Democratic Party
|
|2.17%
|-
|style="background-color:"|
|align=left|Valery Baranovich
|align=left|Independent
|
|1.79%
|-
|style="background-color:"|
|align=left|Karp Didenko
|align=left|Independent
|
|1.78%
|-
|style="background-color:"|
|align=left|Andrey Smolovik
|align=left|Independent
|
|1.55%
|-
|style="background-color:"|
|align=left|Valentin Arkhipov
|align=left|Independent
|
|1.41%
|-
|style="background-color:#DBB726"|
|align=left|Valery Salazkin
|align=left|Democratic Party
|
|0.50%
|-
|style="background-color:#000000"|
|colspan=2 |against all
|
|14.57%
|-
| colspan="5" style="background-color:#E9E9E9;"|
|- style="font-weight:bold"
| colspan="3" style="text-align:left;" | Total
| 
| 100%
|-
| colspan="5" style="background-color:#E9E9E9;"|
|- style="font-weight:bold"
| colspan="4" |Source:
|
|}

2016

|-
! colspan=2 style="background-color:#E9E9E9;text-align:left;vertical-align:top;" |Candidate
! style="background-color:#E9E9E9;text-align:left;vertical-align:top;" |Party
! style="background-color:#E9E9E9;text-align:right;" |Votes
! style="background-color:#E9E9E9;text-align:right;" |%
|-
|style="background-color: " |
|align=left|Aleksandr Avdeyev
|align=left|United Russia
|
|46.66%
|-
|style="background-color:"|
|align=left|Nikolay Yashkin
|align=left|Communist Party
|
|17.12%
|-
|style="background-color:"|
|align=left|Marina Trishina
|align=left|Liberal Democratic Party
|
|11.25%
|-
|style="background-color:"|
|align=left|Nadezhda Yefremova
|align=left|A Just Russia
|
|8.05%
|-
|style="background:"| 
|align=left|Aleksey Kolesnikov
|align=left|Yabloko
|
|4.52%
|-
|style="background:"| 
|align=left|Anton Tarasenko
|align=left|Communists of Russia
|
|3.78%
|-
|style="background-color:"|
|align=left|Aleksandr Chernov
|align=left|Rodina
|
|3.30%
|-
|style="background-color:"|
|align=left|Andrey Bekker
|align=left|Patriots of Russia
|
|1.70%
|-
| colspan="5" style="background-color:#E9E9E9;"|
|- style="font-weight:bold"
| colspan="3" style="text-align:left;" | Total
| 
| 100%
|-
| colspan="5" style="background-color:#E9E9E9;"|
|- style="font-weight:bold"
| colspan="4" |Source:
|
|}

2021

|-
! colspan=2 style="background-color:#E9E9E9;text-align:left;vertical-align:top;" |Candidate
! style="background-color:#E9E9E9;text-align:left;vertical-align:top;" |Party
! style="background-color:#E9E9E9;text-align:right;" |Votes
! style="background-color:#E9E9E9;text-align:right;" |%
|-
|style="background-color: " |
|align=left|Olga Korobova
|align=left|United Russia
|
|35.65%
|-
|style="background-color:"|
|align=left|Nikolay Yashkin
|align=left|Communist Party
|
|20.14%
|-
|style="background-color:"|
|align=left|Aleksandr Bychkov
|align=left|A Just Russia — For Truth
|
|10.08%
|-
|style="background-color: " |
|align=left|Dmitry Zubov
|align=left|New People
|
|8.13%
|-
|style="background-color: "|
|align=left|Vladimir Mikhaylov
|align=left|Party of Pensioners
|
|6.36%
|-
|style="background-color:"|
|align=left|Igor Golovnev
|align=left|Liberal Democratic Party
|
|6.21%
|-
|style="background:"| 
|align=left|Mikhail Matiko
|align=left|Communists of Russia
|
|5.16%
|-
|style="background-color:"|
|align=left|Viktor Shcherbakov
|align=left|The Greens
|
|2.42%
|-
|style="background:"| 
|align=left|Dmitry Rakhe
|align=left|Party of Growth
|
|1.04%
|-
| colspan="5" style="background-color:#E9E9E9;"|
|- style="font-weight:bold"
| colspan="3" style="text-align:left;" | Total
| 
| 100%
|-
| colspan="5" style="background-color:#E9E9E9;"|
|- style="font-weight:bold"
| colspan="4" |Source:
|
|}

Notes

References

Russian legislative constituencies
Politics of Kaluga Oblast